Vinícius Barrivieira (born July 19, 1985 in Marechal Cândido Rondon-SP), or simply Vinícius, is a Brazilian footballer who plays as a goalkeeper for Mixto.

Career
Vinícius is a product of Atlético Paranaense's youth system. He made his first-team debut during the 2005 season on February 23, 2005 in a 3–2 away win over Francisco Beltrão, in a match of Campeonato Paranaense. On 21 October 2007, Vinícius made his Série A debut, keeping a clean sheet against América-RN at Arena da Baixada. In the following two seasons he was second-choice goalkeeper behind Rodrigo Galatto.

On 8 February 2010 Vinícius was loaned to Esporte Clube Vitória for four months, where he earned 5 league appearances.

On 10 August 2010, it was announced that Barrivieira would join the Bulgarian side Litex Lovech on a loan deal. He won the A PFG title with the team from Lovech in 2011.

Club statistics

Honours

Club
Atlético Paranaense
 Dallas Cup: 2004
 Paraná State League: 2005

Litex Lovech
 A Group: 2010–11

References

External links

 
 Profile on conquestsports.net
 Profile furacao.com 
 

1985 births
Living people
Brazilian footballers
Club Athletico Paranaense players
Esporte Clube Vitória players
PFC Litex Lovech players
Vila Nova Futebol Clube players
América Futebol Clube (RN) players
FC Cascavel players
Mixto Esporte Clube players
Campeonato Brasileiro Série A players
First Professional Football League (Bulgaria) players
Association football goalkeepers
Expatriate footballers in Bulgaria